Andreaea is a genus of rock mosses described by Johann Hedwig in 1801.

They are small, delicate acrocarpous mosses (meaning that the capsules are formed at the tips of vertical branches) that form dark brown or reddish cushions on wet siliceous rocks in mountainous areas. The capsule lacks the peristome teeth and operculum of other mosses, and opens by splitting along 4 vertical slits, the four valves remaining joined at the base and apex. The capsule of Andreaea has no seta, but the sporophyte (Spf in the diagram below) instead is supported by a pseudopodium (ps) derived from gametophyte tissue, as in Sphagnum and the columella is enclosed within the sporangium. The spores germinate to give thalloid protonemata.

Species
In alphabetical order:

References

External links 
 Zander, Richard H. 2007. Bryophyte Flora of North America: Andreaeaceae
 Universidad Complutense de Madrid. MUSGOS - Biodiversidad y Taxonomía de Plantas Criptógamas: 

Andreaeaceae
Moss genera